(Georg) Friedrich Weißler (born 28 April 1891 in Königshütte, Upper Silesia; died 19 February 1937 at Sachsenhausen concentration camp) was a German lawyer and judge. He came from a Jewish family but was baptized as Protestant as a child. He belonged to the Christian resistance against National Socialism.

Biography 
In March 1933, Weißler was dismissed as a judge due to his opposition to the Nazis. He moved to Berlin and collaborated with the Protestant opposition (Confessing Church) within the Evangelical Church of the old-Prussian Union. From November 1934 on, he helped - as a legal advisor for the opposition - to cover the old-Prussian state bishop Ludwig Müller and his willing subordinates with a wave of litigations in the ordinary courts in order to reach verdicts on his arbitrary measures violating the church constitution (Kirchenordnung). Since Müller usually acted without legal basis the courts often proved the litigants to be right.

Weißler had already worked as legal advisor for the first preliminary church executive, the rivalling executive body, organised by the Confessing Church for the else Nazi-submissive German Evangelical Church. He was also appointed as legal advisor to the second preliminary church executive and further became its office manager.

At Pentecost 1936 (31 May), the second preliminary church executive prepared a "memorandum" ("Denkschrift") to Hitler, also to be read from the pulpits (on 23 August 1936), condemning anti-Semitism, Nazi concentration camps and state terrorism.  The memorandum was delivered to Hitler at the Chancelry on 4 June 1936, but there was no reaction from the government.   A draft was then leaked to and published in the foreign press in July 1936, during the build-up to the Olympic Games.  
If blood, race, nationhood and honour are given the rank of eternal values, so the Evangelical Christian is compelled by the First Commandment, to oppose that judgement. If the Aryan human is glorified, so it is God's word, which testifies the sinfulness of all human beings. If - in the scope of the National Socialist weltanschauung - an anti-Semitism, obliging to hatred of the Jews, is imposed on the individual Christian, so for him the Christian virtue of charity is standing against that.

The memorandum concluded that the Nazi regime would definitely lead the German people into disaster.

On 7 October 1936, the Gestapo arrested Weißler, erroneously blaming him for passing the memorandum into the hands of foreign media. Weißler and two Aryan assistants who also worked for Confessing Church were arrested. Whereas the aryans were ultimately released, the church did not intervene for Weißler. He was not taken to court, where the evidentially false blaming would have been easily unveiled, but deported to Sachsenhausen concentration camp and tortured to death from 13 to 19 February 1937 becoming the first, "full Jew", lethal victim of the Kirchenkampf on the Protestant side.

Notes

1891 births
1937 deaths
German Jews who died in the Holocaust
Converts to Protestantism from Judaism
20th-century German lawyers
Protestants in the German Resistance
People from Chorzów
People from the Province of Silesia
People celebrated in the Lutheran liturgical calendar
People who died in Sachsenhausen concentration camp
Resistance members who died in Nazi concentration camps
People executed by torture
German people executed in Nazi concentration camps
Executed people from Silesian Voivodeship
Jews in the German resistance